The 2020–21 Chennaiyin FC season was the club's seventh season since its establishment in 2014 and their seventh season in the Indian Super League

Technical staff

Coaching Staff

Management Staff

Board of Directors

Players

 

 

 

In bold:Winter Transfer

Transfer

Transfers In

In bold:Winter Transfer

Transfers Out

In bold:Winter Transfer

Pre Season and Friendlies

Owing the COVID-19 pandemic, all the clubs including Chennaiyin FC couldn't have a proper preseason. The preseason time was cut short this season. The Chennaiyin began their preseason against one of their fellow Indian Super League opponent, Mumbai City FC on 2 November 2020.

Competitions

Indian Super League

League table

Result summary

Results by round

Matches

Squad Statistics

Squad statistics

Statistics
2020-21 Indian Super League season Statistics

Goal scorers

Assists

Yellow cards

Red cards

References

Chennaiyin FC seasons
Chennaiyin